Oliver Goddard Snow (February 20, 1849 – August 13, 1931) was a member of the Utah Territorial Legislature.

Snow was born to Lorenzo Snow and his wife Adeline Goddard. He was born in Salt Lake City but at a fairly young age moved with his parents to Brigham City, Utah, where his father was the leading authority in the Church of Jesus Christ of Latter-day Saints (LDS Church).

Snow worked on building the transcontinental railroad. He then studied for a time at the University of Deseret (the predecessor of the University of Utah) under John R. Park. From 1870 to 1873, Snow served as a missionary for the LDS Church in the United Kingdom. In October 1873, he married Mary B. Peirce.

In 1875, Snow served another mission, this time in the Eastern States Mission, based in New York City. In 1877, when the Box Elder Stake of the LDS Church was organized, encompassing all of Box Elder County, Utah, and headquartered in Brigham City, Snow was made the stake president, in many ways succeeding his father who had been essentially functioning like a stake president. Snow was released as stake president in 1888. From 1880 to 1886, he served as a member of the Utah Territorial Legislature from Box Elder County.

Snow died in Los Angeles, California.

References
Andrew Jenson. Latter-day Saint Biographical Encyclopedia. Salt Lake City: Andrwew Jensen Publishing Company, 1901. Vol. 1, p. 389.

1849 births
1931 deaths
People from Brigham City, Utah
American leaders of the Church of Jesus Christ of Latter-day Saints
American Mormon missionaries in the United States
19th-century Mormon missionaries
American Mormon missionaries in the United Kingdom
University of Utah alumni
Members of the Utah Territorial Legislature
19th-century American politicians
Latter Day Saints from Utah